Calytrix aurea is a species of shrub in the family Myrtaceae, endemic to the south-west of Western Australia. It was first formally described by botanist John Lindley in 1839 in A sketch of the vegetation of the Swan River Colony.

The species usually grows to between 0.2 and 1.3  metres in height. The yellow flowers appear between October and January in its native range.

It performs best in a sunny position and requires a well-drained situation, such as a built-up rockery. Plants are readily propagated by cuttings.

References

Myrtales of Australia
aurea
Rosids of Western Australia